Duck Down Presents: The Album is a compilation album by American New-York based hip hop record label Duck Down Records featured all new tracks recorded from Boot Camp Clik members and affiliates. It was released on September 14, 1999 via Priority Records. Recording sessions took place at D&D Studios, the Enterprize Studio and Unique Recording Studios in New York, and at the Spanish Coop in Los Angeles. Production was handled by Da Beatminerz, Arkatech Beatz, Buckshot, Eek-A-Mouse and Mike Caren among others. The album received very mediocre reviews. Black Moon's single "Jump Up" peaked at number 24 on the Hot Rap Songs.

Track listing

References

External links

Boot Camp Clik albums
Duck Down Music albums
1999 compilation albums
Albums produced by Da Beatminerz
Priority Records compilation albums
Albums produced by the Infinite Arkatechz